In My Life is the fourth album from American new-age pianist Kevin Kern. As with his preceding and succeeding albums, it is an album of instrumental songs. It was released on August 24, 1999.

This is Kern's first album to feature compositions not written by him; prior to this, all of his album's songs were solely self-composed.

Inspirations
This album marks the first time that Kern covered a song recorded by another artist, namely Elton John's "We All Fall in Love Sometimes" from his 1975 album Captain Fantastic and the Brown Dirt Cowboy, and the Beatles' "In My Life" from their 1965 album Rubber Soul. According to the liner notes of the album, while growing up, Kern and his brother would jam along to Beatles records as soon as they were released.

In addition to this, the song "Emerald Legacy", according to Kern, is inspired by his father's Irish tenor, which was also a part of his childhood. The song "To Sleep on Angels' Wings" is dedicated to his mother.

Track listing
All compositions by Kevin Kern, except where noted.

"We All Fall in Love Sometimes" (Elton John, Bernie Taupin) - 4:26
"Love's First Smile" - 6:09
"Tomorrow's Promise" - 3:58
"Bittersweet" - 5:08
"To Sleep on Angels' Wings" - 4:30
"Touch the Sky" - 4:48
"Passages" (contains samples of Spectrasonics Symphony of Voices and Hans Zimmer Guitars Volume II) - 4:25
"Twirling in Time" - 3:59
"Dance of the Searching Souls" - 4:26
"Emerald Legacy" - 6:51
"In My Life" (John Lennon, Paul McCartney) - 3:30

Liner Notes
In My Life, Real Music's fourth release from this well-loved pianist, offers a further palette of exquisite melodies played with Kern's graceful, accomplished touch. It also marks a departure into a new realm where Kern expands his dynamic range. Included on this album are two gorgeous arrangements of Elton John and Lennon/McCartney songs.

In My Life strikes a beautiful balance of songs to comfort the heart and uplift the spirit.

Personnel 
 Kevin Kern – Yamaha piano, Kurzweil K2500 synthesizer, producer, composer, arrangement
 Jeremy Cohen - D'Addario-stringed violin
 Ron Davis - recording, mixing
 Ron Hess - arrangement
 Eric Kotila - design
 Thalia Moore - cello
 Michael Romanowski - mastering
 Michael Spiro - percussion
 Kevin Wakefield - sound design
 Michael Wilcox - electric bass
 Terence Yallop – executive producer

References

External links 
 
 Kevin Kern at Real Music

In My Life
Kevin Kern albums